Manuel Mascarenhas Homem was a colonial governor. 

Homem was appointed in under Philip II of Portugal, Governor of Pernambuco between 1596 and 1605.

In 1614, he was the Governor of Portuguese Ceylon, serving until 1616 and being succeeded by Nuno Álvares Pereira.

References

Governors of Portuguese Ceylon
16th-century Portuguese people
17th-century Portuguese people